Woninjae Station is a commuter train station on Line 1 of the Incheon Subway and the Suin-Bundang Line of the Seoul Metropolitan Subway . The station became a transfer point to the above-ground Suin-Bundang Line (then the Suin Line) in July 2012. The platforms of these two lines are located far apart, requiring passengers to walk a long distance when transferring.

Exits

Gallery

References

Metro stations in Incheon
Seoul Metropolitan Subway stations
Railway stations in South Korea opened in 1999
Yeonsu District